Harmony is the fifth studio album released by country music artist Don Williams. It was released in 1976 (see 1976 in country music) by ABC Records, and is his only album to have reached number one on the Top Country Albums chart. The singles, "Till the Rivers All Run Dry" and "Say It Again" reached number one on the US country singles chart while "She Never Knew Me" peaked at number two.

Content
Most of the songs on Harmony were written or co-written by Williams.

Track listing
Side one

"'Til the Rivers All Run Dry" (Wayland Holyfield, Don Williams) - 3:27
"You Keep Coming 'Round" (Williams) - 2:45
"Don't You Think It's Time" (Williams) - 3:22
"I Don't Want the Money" (Williams) - 2:52
"Where the Arkansas River Leaves Oklahoma" (Holyfield) - 4:02

Side two

"Say It Again" (Bob McDill) - 2:56
"Maybe I Just Don't Know" (Williams) - 3:00
"Magic Carpet" (Larry Kingston, Frank Dycus) - 2:44
"Time" (Michael Merchant) 2:49
"Ramblin'" - Instrumental (Williams) - 2:49
"She Never Knew Me" (McDill, Holyfield) - 2:46

Production
All tracks produced by Don Williams
Recorded at Jack Clement Recording Studios by Garth Fundis

Personnel
from liner notes
Joe Allen - electric and upright bass, background and harmony vocals
Jimmy Colvard - electric guitar, acoustic guitar
Danny Flowers - harmonica
Garth Fundis - background and harmony vocals
Lloyd Green - steel guitar, dobro
Wayland Holyfield - background and harmony vocals
Shane Keister - keyboards
Kenny Malone - drums, conga, marimba
Sharon Vaughn - harmony vocals
Don Williams - lead and background vocals, acoustic guitar

String arrangements by Bill McElhiney. String productions by Don Williams and Jim Foglesong.

Charts

Weekly charts

Year-end charts

Sources

1976 albums
Don Williams albums
ABC Records albums